is a Japanese women's professional shogi player ranked 2-dan.

Promotion history
Inagawa's promotion history is as follows:

 2-kyū: October 1, 2006
 1-kyū: April 1, 2008
 1-dan: July 12, 2013
 2-dan: April 6, 2021

Note: All ranks are women's professional ranks.

References

External links
 ShogiHub: Inagawa, Manaka

1991 births
Living people
People from Kisarazu
Japanese shogi players
Women's professional shogi players
Professional shogi players from Chiba Prefecture